Ernst Helmut Berndt (17 June 1915 – 30 April 1990) was a Sudeten German-Czechoslovak athlete who competed in both track and field and luge. As a hurdler he represented Czechoslovakia at the 1936 Summer Olympics. Berndt was born in Liberec in June 1915. He moved to Lower Saxony after World War II and took up luge. Competing for West Germany, he became the German national champion in 1958 before winning the gold medal in the men's singles event at the 1960 FIL World Luge Championships in Garmisch-Partenkirchen. He died in Seesen in April 1990 at the age of 74.

References

1915 births
1990 deaths
Czechoslovak male hurdlers
German male lugers
West German sportsmen
Olympic athletes of Czechoslovakia
Athletes (track and field) at the 1936 Summer Olympics
German Bohemian people
Sudeten German people